is an interchange passenger railway station located in the city of Yao, Osaka, Japan, operated by West Japan Railway Company (JR West).

Lines
It is also served by the Osaka Higashi Line, and is 20.2 kilometers from the terminus of that line at Shin-Osaka Station.

Layout
The station consists of two island platforms serving four tracks, connected by an elevated station building. The station has a Midori no Madoguchi staffed ticket office.

Platforms

History
The station opened on 1 December 1910. With the privatization of Japanese National Railways (JNR) on 1 April 1987, the station came under the control of JR West.

Station numbering was introduced in March 2018 with Kyūhōji being assigned station number JR-Q24 or the Yamatoji Line and JR-F15 for the Osaka-Higashi Line.

Passenger statistics
In fiscal 2019, the station was used by an average of 18,112 passengers daily (boarding passengers only).

Surrounding Area
 Kyūhō-ji temple
 Yao City Hospital

See also
List of railway stations in Japan

References

External links

 Yao Station Official Site

Railway stations in Japan opened in 1910
Railway stations in Osaka Prefecture
Yao, Osaka